Her Mother's Killer is a Colombian drama television series created by Clara María Ochoa and Ana Piñeres for Caracol Televisión. The series aired from 15 April 2020 to 3 July 2020, a total of 53 episodes. It stars Carolina Gómez as the title character. The show is available in 4K UHDTV.

The series became available for streaming on 26 August 2020 on Netflix. On Netflix the series has a total of 56 episodes.

Premise 
Analía (Carolina Gómez) is a beautiful woman who decides to exact revenge against her mother's killer, Guillermo León Mejía (Marlon Moreno), who is a Presidential candidate. She travels abroad and prepares to become the most important political advisor in the country. When she feels ready, she returns and becomes Mejía's right hand and strategist. Her plan consists in gaining his trust, placing him first in the polls, only to then destroy him by shedding light on his past and his corruption and illegal actions. Her goal is for him to lose the presidency and even his freedom. In her road to vengeance, Analía faces many truths that will put her decision to a test. Among those, the possibility that by destroying the man she hates she might need to also destroy the only man she has ever loved, Pablo de la Torre (George Slebi).

Cast

Main 
 Carolina Gómez as Analía Guerrero
 Marlon Moreno as Guillermo León Mejía
 George Slebi as Pablo de la Torre
 Geraldine Zivic as Rosario Castiblanco de Mejía
 María Cecilia Botero as Eugenia Castiblanco de De la Torre
 Andrea Gómez as Dora Serna "Dorita"
 Juliana Galvis as Carolina Valencia
 Kristina Lilley as Andrea Correa / Susana Guerrero
 Edwin Maya as Juan Mario Mejía Castiblanco
 Viviana Santos as Sofía Mejía Castiblanco
 Alejandro Gutiérrez as Santiago Castiblanco
 Michelle Manterola as Isabella Aponte
 Juan Alfonso Baptista as Mark Salinas
 Carolina Cuervo as Liliana Camargo
 Matías Maldonado as Andrei Robiras "Toto"
 Mauricio Figueroa as Manuel José de la Torre
 John Ceballos as Edgar Aponte
 Diego Sarmiento as Ramiro Cuéllar
 Vladimir Bernal as Mayor Vélez
 Juan Manuel Oróstegui as Jairo "el Ingeniero"
 Ricardo Mejía as David de la Torre
 María Elvira Arango as Sacha
 Julieta Villar as Helena de la Torre Valencia
 Orlando Valenzuela as Ramiro Pérez
 Manuel Sarmiento as Salvador Suárez
 Ana Wills as Alejandra Mejía Castiblanco
 María Camila Giraldo as Lupita
 Édgar Vittorino as Estefano Ibague
 Edinson Gil as Lebrón Días
 Víctor Hugo Trespalacios as Don Rosendo

Recurring 
 Brian Moreno as Child Guillermo León Mejía "Memo"
 Rebeca Milanés as Darelis Junca
 María Fernanda Duque as Child Ana Lucia Junca "Rana"
 Jacobo Díez as Child Pablo de la Torre
 Gerónimo Barón as Child David de la Torre
 Carlos Camacho as Young Manuel José de la Torre
 Adelaida Buscató as Young Eugenia de la Torre
 Mariana Fernández as Young Rosario Castiblanco
 Marisol Correa as Young Andrea Correa
 Juan David González as Young Santiago Castiblanco
 Ariana Ovalle as Child Dora Serna "Dorita"
 Jeshua Rico as Child Andrei Robiras "Toto"
 Alejandra Villamizar as Young Fabiola Contreras
 Diego Mateus as el Teniente Agustín Bahamón
 Javier Gnecco Jr. as Darío Cabo
 Gerardo Calero as Mariano
 Felipe Estupiñán as Laso
 Julián Mora as "Tarántula"
 Obeida Benavides as Doña Nidia
 Lillyana Guihurt as Gisela Castiblanco

Episodes

Reception 
The series premiered on 15 April 2020, replacing the program A Otro Nivel, due to not having recorded enough episodes to continue its broadcast due to the COVID-19 pandemic in Colombia. In its broadcast the series recorded a 11.4 rating, positioning itself as the most viewed program during its premiere along the series El General Naranjo. Since its premiere, many viewers have compared the series to Telemundo's telenovela El Rostro de Analía, but Caracol did not confirm that this new series is a remake.

Television ratings

References 

Colombian telenovelas
2020 Colombian television series debuts
2020 Colombian television series endings
Spanish-language telenovelas
Caracol Televisión telenovelas
2020 telenovelas